On 1 December 1988, a LAZ-687 bus carrying thirty fourth-grade pupils and one teacher from school 42 in Ordzhonikidze, Soviet Union (now Vladikavkaz in Russia) was hijacked by five armed criminals, led by Pavel Yakshiyants.

The local authorities conceded to the hijackers' demands and provided an Ilyushin Il-76 aircraft to fly the hijackers to Israel. Upon landing at Tel Aviv's Ben Gurion Airport, however, the hijackers surrendered to local troops and police without resistance. They were extradited to the Soviet Union and sentenced to prison terms, although at that time Israel and the Soviet Union had no extradition treaty as relations were still severed at the time. All hostages were released. Then–Defense Minister of Israel Yitzhak Rabin criticized Soviet authorities for providing the hijackers with an aircraft and flying them to Israel in exchange for the release of the hostages.

Perpetrators
The five hijackers were Pavel Levonovich Yakshiyants, Vladimir Alexandrovich Muravlev, German Lvovich Vishnyakov, Vladimir Robertovich Anastasov and Tofiy Jafarov. Yakshiyants and Muravlev were convicts. Yakshiyants, an Armenian, was first convicted when he was 17 and sentenced to two years in prison for theft. Later he was sentenced to four years in prison for robbery. In 1972, he was sentenced to ten years, again for robbery, but in 1979 he was released on parole.

Hijacking
The schoolchildren had finished a field trip to a local printing plant when a man approached them saying he was the driver sent to take them home. Subsequently, the teacher and her 10- and 11-year-old pupils boarded the bus to find themselves the hostages of five armed people. The children were used as a human shield and bargaining chip. The hijackers rode to the local obkom and demanded about 2 million rubles (about US$3.3 million at the time) and an aircraft. The bus windows were curtained so that the law enforcement units could not see what was happening inside.

The authorities conceded, but the airport of Ordzhonikidze was unable to handle the large Ilyushin Il-76 cargo aircraft, that was sent. The hijackers rode to the airport of Mineralnye Vody, having a free passage. Alpha Group was mobilized for hostage rescue. It learned that the hijackers were planning to land in Tashkent to pick up their friend. Then they planned to fly to Pakistan, but changed their mind and chose Israel instead. According to Israeli Army commander Maj. Gen. Amram Mitzna, the hijackers believed they would be safe in Israel because they had heard that recent Israeli elections had produced an anticommunist government.

The aircraft, escorted by Israeli fighter aircraft, landed on a remote darkened runway. It was surrounded by army and police vehicles and ambulances. According to an Ilyushin Il-76 crew member, the hijackers asked whether this was Israel or Syria and if this is Israel they would stay. Mitzna told that the hijackers demanded proof that they were actually in Israel, wanting to hear Yiddish or see a Star of David. When a soldier on the runway spoke a few words in Yiddish, the hijackers left the aircraft with their hands in the air. The hostages were flown back to Ordzhonikidze.

Media
The 1990 film Frenzied Bus was based on the hijacking.

References

1988 crimes in Russia
1988 in international relations
1988 in Israel
1988 in the Soviet Union
Aircraft hijackings
December 1988 crimes
December 1988 events in Europe
Hostage taking in Russia
Israel–Soviet Union relations
Lod
Vladikavkaz